Blochmannia is a genus of symbiotic bacteria found in carpenter ant.  There are over 1000 species of these ants and, as of 2014, of the over 30 species of carpenter ant that have been investigated, all contain some form of Blochmannia.  The bacteria filled cells currently known as members of the genus Blochmannia were first discovered by zoologist F. Blochmann in the ovaries and midguts of insects in the 1880s.  In 2000 Candidatus Blochmannia was proposed as its own genus.

Endosymbiosis, or when the Blochmannia  bacteria and the ant hosts became bonded, occurred around 30–40 million years ago.  In comparing two species of Blochmannia  that diverged evolutionarily around 15-20 million years ago, the extreme similarity between their genes means Blochmannia  bacteria have high levels of genetic conservation.  The high amounts of genetic conservation suggest that the Blochmannia  genes lack some recombination mechanisms.

Blochmannia  bacteria are found in the midguts of carpenter ants, as well as the ovaries of the female carpenter ants.  Blochmannia  is important in synthesizing essential and non essential amino acids, including tyrosine, and it helps the ant to process nitrogen. The Blochmannia  bacteria improves the ants’ nutrition and, in doing this, it is also important to the overall health of the ant colony.  According to the study by Zientz et al., Blochmannia  improves the health of the colony of ants as a whole because worker ants use a "trophallaxis and regurgitation" system to provide the colony with food.  When control colonies which had Blochmannia  were compared to groups where the worker ants had been given antibiotics to reduce their levels of Blochmannia , the health of the control colony was superior.   Zientz proposes that this superior fitness of the control ant colonies is likely due to Blochmannia  improving the nutritional quality of the food that worker ants supply to the young ants, as the health effects of Blochmannia  appear to decrease with the ant's maturation.

Blochmannia  bacteria are sensitive to heat.  In one experiment, when exposed to an increased heat of 99.87 °F (37.7 °C) for 4 weeks, over 99% of Blochmannia  disappeared. However, even after 16 weeks exposure of this heat exposure, trace small amounts of Blochmannia survived.  According to researchers Fan and Wernegreen, this experiment suggests that the Blochmannia in ants could be vulnerable to the effects of global warming.

References 

Enterobacteriaceae
Candidatus taxa